Linda Ellerbee (born Linda Jane Smith; August 15, 1944) is an American journalist, anchor, producer, reporter, author, speaker and commentator, noted as longtime Washington correspondent for NBC News and host of NBC News Overnight.  She is widely known as the twenty-five year host of Nick News, Nickelodeon's highly rated and recognized news program for older school-aged children and teens that addressed substantive issues, including wars, disease and disasters, without condescension.

Ellerbee's work on NBC News Overnight was recognized by the jurors of the duPont Columbia Awards as "possibly the best written and most intelligent news program ever." Described as literate, smart, unapologetic, assertive and keenly observant, Ellerbee formally retired in 2015, after 43 years in journalism.

Biography

Early life
Ellerbee was born Linda Jane Smith in Bryan, Texas. She attended River Oaks Elementary School, Lanier Middle School, and Lamar High School in Houston.

She also attended Vanderbilt University in Nashville, Tennessee, dropping out in 1964. Ellerbee traveled around the country for some time afterward, working itinerant jobs in radio. Ellerbee wrote:

After a stint working for Terry Miller, majority leader of the Alaska Senate, she was hired by the Dallas bureau of the Associated Press to write copy. She claims to have been fired after writing a catty personal letter on the AP's word processors and accidentally sending the letter out on the wire. The letter brought her to the attention of Houston CBS television affiliate KHOU-TV, which hired her to replace Jessica Savitch in January 1973. Within several months, she was hired by New York's WCBS-TV.

Career
At NBC, Ellerbee worked as a reporter on Today. Her first anchor job was on the prime-time version of Weekend. Ellerbee joined Lloyd Dobyns as co-host of Weekend when the show moved from its late-night time slot (where it rotated with Saturday Night Live, generally one Saturday night per month) into direct prime time competition with CBS's 60 Minutes. As with the late-night incarnation, they would sign-off with the phrase, "And so it goes."

In 1982, Ellerbee was again teamed with Dobyns (and later Bill Schechner) as hosts of NBC News Overnight, where their trademark writing style made the show somewhat reminiscent of their stint on Weekend. They ended each broadcast with a short, usually wry, commentary, again signing off with the catch-phrase, "And so it goes," which later became the title of her first memoir. While at NBC, Ellerbee worked with Jessica Savitch; when Savitch's drug problems became apparent Ellerbee tried to organize an intervention, but Savitch died before that happened.

In 1984, after the cancellation of Overnight, Ellerbee moved to Summer Sunday USA, as co-anchor with Andrea Mitchell, the first time a prime-time network news program was co-anchored by two women. She was then a correspondent for Today before moving to rival network ABC in 1986. There she served as a reporter for the morning program Good Morning America. At ABC, Ellerbee was able to co-write and co-anchor (with Ray Gandolf) Our World, a weekly primetime historical series. She won an Emmy Award for her work on that program.

In 1987, Ellerbee and her husband and business partner Rolfe Tessem left network news to start their own production company, Lucky Duck Productions. The company has produced programs for every major cable network, and has as its flagship program Nick News, a news program for children on Nickelodeon. That show has received many awards: three Peabody Awards (including one personal Peabody given to Ellerbee for her coverage of the Clinton investigation), another duPont Columbia Award and three Emmys. In 2004, Ellerbee was honored with an Emmy for her WE: Women's Entertainment network series When I Was a Girl.

In 1989, she guest-starred as herself in an episode of the sitcom Murphy Brown. The episode "Summer of '77" referenced that Ellerbee had auditioned for the anchor job which eventually went to the title character, played by Candice Bergen. In the episode, Murphy Brown also accuses Ellerbee of stealing the catchphrase "And so it goes ..." from her during a long-haul flight. The two reminisce, with Ellerbee saying she might like to go back to an old network job, and Brown wanting to take some time off to write a book. Both reply with "Nahh ...".

Also in 1989, Ellerbee created a minor uproar by appearing in television commercials for Maxwell House coffee. The New York Times said the commercials were poorly done even as advertisements, but also betrayed her trademark "uncompromising intellectual honesty" and "sardonic wit" — and were mercenary, "devaluing both broadcast news and broadcast advertising." Because of the format of the commercials, set with a mock anchor's background, Advertising Age said "this is advertising news disguised as NBC news." Ellerbee would later share that journalist Jimmy Breslin called to supportively remind her that when he made a beer commercial, they let him keep his Pulitzer Prize.

Her autobiography, And So It Goes, was published in 1986. A second book of memoirs, Move On: Adventures in the Real World, was published in 1991 and a third, Take Big Bites: Adventures Around the World and Across the Table, in 2005. In addition, she has authored an eight-part series of Girl Reporter books for young people, as well as a syndicated newspaper column.

In 1992, Ellerbee was diagnosed with breast cancer and had a double mastectomy. Since then, she has spent much of her time speaking to groups about how she fought the cancer and how women need to fight the disease, demand better medical treatment, and maintain a healthy sense of humor.

Employment

National television and film 
 Reporter, the Washington bureau of NBC News, 1976–1978
 Co-anchor, network news magazine Weekend , 1978–1979
 Correspondent, NBC Nightly News, 1979–1982
 Co-anchor, NBC News Overnight, 1982–1984
 Co-anchor, Summer Sunday USA, 1984
 Reporter, Today, 1984–1986
 Reporter, Good Morning America, 1986
 Anchor, Our World, 1986–1987
Narrator, Baby Boom, 1987
 President, Lucky Duck Productions, since 1987
 Commentator, CNN, 1989 
 Producer, writer, and host, Nick News with Linda Ellerbee 1992–2015

Radio, local television, print, and online
 Disc jockey at WSDM Chicago 1965–1968
 Program director, KSJO San Francisco, 1967–1968
 Reporter, KJNO Juneau, Alaska, 1969–1972
 News writer, Associated Press in Dallas, Texas, 1972
 Television reporter, KHOU in Houston, 1972–1973
 General assignment reporter, WCBS-TV in New York City, 1973–1976
 Writer, host, On the Record
 On-line production with Microsoft, since 1996
 Panelist, The Roundtable, WAMC, 2020–

Bibliography

Non-fiction

Fiction

Accolades
1992 NOW NYC's Women of Power & Influence Award 
1998 Personal Peabody Award
 2011: Paul White Award, Radio Television Digital News Association

References

External links
 Linda Ellerbee biography on the Museum of Broadcast Communications website
 
 
 
 

1944 births
20th-century American journalists
21st-century American journalists
American children's writers
American memoirists
American television news anchors
American women memoirists
American women television journalists
Journalists from Texas
Lamar High School (Houston, Texas) alumni
Living people
ABC News personalities
NBC News people
Peabody Award winners
People from Bryan, Texas
Vanderbilt University alumni
20th-century American women
21st-century American women